Dunked in the Deep is a 1949 short subject directed by Jules White starring American slapstick comedy team The Three Stooges (Moe Howard, Larry Fine and Shemp Howard). It is the 119th entry in the series released by Columbia Pictures starring the comedians, who released 190 shorts for the studio between 1934 and 1959.

Plot
The Stooges are tricked into becoming stowaways by their neighbor Mr. Borscht (Gene Roth), a spy for a fictitious USSR-like country. Stranded on a freighter on the high seas, and sustained by eating salami, they discover that Borscht has concealed stolen microfilm in watermelons. After a wild chase, the boys overtake Borscht and recover the microfilm.

Cast
 Moe Howard as Moe and Voice on Radio
 Larry Fine as Larry
 Shemp Howard as Shemp
 Gene Roth as Borscht

Production notes
Dunked in the Deep was reworked in 1956 as Commotion on the Ocean (Shemp's final film with the team at columbia(although filmed after his death), using ample stock footage.

The voice heard on the radio broadcast is Moe; Shemp Howard accidentally cut his hand on the lock when he rushes to the door in an effort to open it.

Hiding microfilm in watermelons is an allusion to an actual event from the previous year. In 1948, Time managing editor Whittaker Chambers, a former Communist spy-turned government informer, accused Alger Hiss of being a member of the Communist Party and a spy for the Soviet Union. In presenting evidence against Hiss, Chambers produced the "Pumpkin Papers": five rolls of microfilm of State Department documents, which Chambers had concealed in a hollowed-out pumpkin on his Maryland farm.

Dunked in the Deep was filmed March 29-April 1, 1949 and was actually the 126th Stooge short filmed even though it was released as the 119th. The first seven Stooge shorts released the following year in 1950 had already been completed before Dunked in the Deep began production.

References

External links 
 
 

1949 films
The Three Stooges films
American black-and-white films
Films directed by Jules White
1949 comedy films
Columbia Pictures short films
American comedy short films
1940s English-language films
1940s American films